Legend of the Phantom Rider is a 2002 American Western horror film directed and produced by Alex Erkiletian and stars Denise Crosby and Robert McRa. It was made in the area of Old Tucson, Arizona. Its budget was estimated to be $1.6 million.

Plot

A woman (Denise Crosby), is raped and her husband and son murdered by 'Blade' (Robert McRay) and his men on the range. She goes to the nearest town for help. But the gang also have it in a vise-like grip and the inhabitants will not assist until a non-speaking stranger confronts the men. In a series of gun battles, Pelgidium (also played by Robert McRay), whittles them down until just two of them support Blade against the man with the disfigured face and mysterious past.

Cast

Release

Home media
The film was released on DVD by MTI Home Video on February 11, 2003.

Reception

Robert Pardi from TV Guide rated the film two out of four stars, writing, "Though this offbeat ghost story/Western hybrid would have benefited from sharper editing and a director with a surer command of suspense set-ups, it's an interesting variation on two sets of familiar themes."

References

External links
 
 
 

2002 films
2000s action horror films
2002 fantasy films
2000s Western (genre) horror films
American action horror films
American Western (genre) horror films
2000s English-language films
Films shot in Tucson, Arizona
2000s American films